Angel Baffard, (Father Angel of St. Rosalie) (1655–1726) was a French genealogist and friar of the Order of Discalced Augustinians.

Biography
He was born François Baffard in 1655 in Blois, in the ancient province of Orléanais.

From the materials collected by Anselm de Guibours, a distinguished scholar and friar of the same Order, and the nobleman, Caille du Fourny, he prepared a revision of Guibours' , which was left unfinished at Baffard's own death, which occurred in Paris in 1726, shortly before the revised first volume was published.

The work was finally completed by Father Simplician, his collaborator in the project begun by Guibours. The latter also prepared three additional volumes.

Baffard's other works include , edited in 1749 by the Benedictines of Saint-Maur, with a supplementary volume on the coronation, the armorial bearings, and prerogatives of the kings of France.

References

French genealogists
Augustinian friars
1655 births
1726 deaths
17th-century French Roman Catholic priests
18th-century French Roman Catholic priests
Writers from Blois
French male non-fiction writers